Isis Marie Casalduc González is a Puerto Rican beauty pageant winner, fashion model and internet entrepreneur. As the Miss Puerto Rico Universe 2002 titleholder, she represented Puerto Rico at the Miss Universe 2002 where she won the Miss Photogenic competition and finished second for the title of Best National Costume after dressing in white lace with embroidered flowers. The former student at the University of Puerto Rico has been described as having a renowned career. Isis Casalduc is married to German filmmaker and entrepreneur Markus Neuert.

References

Living people
Miss Puerto Rico winners
Miss Universe 2002 contestants
People from Utuado, Puerto Rico
1981 births